The 2008 Milwaukee mayoral election was held on Tuesday, April 1, 2004, to elect the mayor for Milwaukee. Tom Barrett was reelected.

Municipal elections in Wisconsin are non-partisan.

Results

References

2008 Wisconsin elections
Milwaukee
2008
Government of Milwaukee